James Mundy (June 28, 1907 – April 24, 1983) was an American jazz tenor saxophonist, arranger, and composer, best known for his arrangements for Benny Goodman, Count Basie, and Earl Hines.

Mundy died of cancer in New York City at the age of 75.

Discography
1937–1947: Jimmy Mundy 1947–1947 (Classics)
May 1946: "Bumble Boogie" / "One O'Clock Boogie" (Aladdin 131)
June 1946: "I Gotta Put You Down Pt 1" / "I Gotta Put You Down Pt 2" (Aladdin 132)
1958: On a Mundy Flight (Epic)
2002: Fiesta in Brass (Golden Era)

As arranger
With Chet Baker
Baker's Holiday (Limelight, 1965)
With Al Hibbler
After the Lights Go Down Low (Atlantic 1957)
With Illinois Jacquet
The Soul Explosion (Prestige, 1969)
With Harry James
Harry James and His Orchestra 1948–49 (Big Band Landmarks Vol. X & XI, 1969)
With Sonny Stitt
Sonny Stitt & the Top Brass (Atlantic, 1962)
Little Green Apples (Solid State, 1969)
Come Hither (Solid State, 1969)
With Joe Williams
A Man Ain't Supposed to Cry (Roulette, 1958)

References

External links

1907 births
1983 deaths
African-American saxophonists
American music arrangers
American jazz saxophonists
American male saxophonists
American jazz composers
American male jazz composers
Big band bandleaders
Jazz arrangers
20th-century American composers
Deaths from cancer in New York (state)
20th-century American saxophonists
20th-century American male musicians
20th-century jazz composers
20th-century African-American musicians